Maurice Kelly (born October 9, 1972) is a former American football defensive back who played two seasons with the Seattle Seahawks of the National Football League. He played college football at East Tennessee State University in Johnson City, Tennessee and attended Orangeburg-Wilkinson Senior High School in Orangeburg, South Carolina. He was also a member of the Las Vegas Posse, Toronto Argonauts, BC Lions and Winnipeg Blue Bombers.

References

External links
Just Sports Stats

Living people
1972 births
Players of American football from South Carolina
American football defensive backs
Canadian football defensive backs
African-American players of American football
African-American players of Canadian football
East Tennessee State Buccaneers football players
Las Vegas Posse players
Toronto Argonauts players
BC Lions players
Seattle Seahawks players
Winnipeg Blue Bombers players
People from Orangeburg, South Carolina
Orangeburg-Wilkinson High School alumni
21st-century African-American sportspeople
20th-century African-American sportspeople